Nenad Protega (born 11 October 1969) is a retired Slovenian football midfielder.

References

1969 births
Living people
Slovenian footballers
Association football midfielders
NK Olimpija Ljubljana (1945–2005) players
NK Svoboda Ljubljana players
ND Gorica players
NK Domžale players
Slovenian PrvaLiga players